Arizona State Prison Complex – Safford is one of 13 prison facilities operated by the Arizona Department of Corrections (ADC). ASPC-Safford is located in Safford, Graham County, Arizona, 173 miles southeast from the state capital of Phoenix, Arizona.

History 

In 1968, the Arizona State Legislature passed a bill making the Fort Grant State Industrial School a part of the State's Department of Corrections.  In 1973, Fort Grant became an adult male prison. In December 1997, the Arizona State Prison at Fort Grant became the Fort Grant Unit of ASPC-Safford.

Designated as a prison complex, Safford had its beginnings as a Department facility in 1970. Then called the Safford Conservation Center, it was a minimum security work camp that housed 185 adult male inmates in tents and Quonset huts before any permanent buildings were erected, the first one a 48-man dormitory constructed in 1976. Two 64-man dormitories were completed by 1983. 

The 1986–87 building program added 100EBUs, in the form of Quonset huts, to expand the capacity of the unit. Today, the prison has a designated capacity of 730 and the Graham and Tonto units house adult male minimum security inmates, the majority working in the community or for other government agencies.

Population 

ASPC-Safford has an inmate capacity of approximately 1,717 in 3 housing units at security levels 2 and 3. The ADC uses a score classification system to assess inmates' appropriate custody and security level placement. The scores range from 1 to 5 with 5 being the highest risk or need.

Human rights abuses 

Amnesty International has singled out the prison as an example of human rights violations in US prisons.  In an incident on August 1995 at the Graham Unit, 600 prisoners were "forced by guards to remain outdoors, handcuffed, for 96 hours, required to defecate and urinate in their clothes. Many suffered severe sunburn, heat exhaustion and dehydration in the intense heat."

See also 
List of U.S. state prisons
List of Arizona state prisons

References

External links 
 Arizona Department of Corrections

Safford
Buildings and structures in Graham County, Arizona
Safford, Arizona
1968 establishments in Arizona